Samuel Love may refer to:
 Samuel G. Love (1821–1893), American teacher and educationist
 Samuel B. Love, politician in the Florida House of Representatives